The Conspiracy Zone is an American discussion program about conspiracy theories with a group of panelists, a mix of experts and celebrities. It was a half hour in length and ran for 26 episodes, though there was also an unaired pilot episode.

The show was hosted by former Saturday Night Live player and comedian Kevin Nealon and was shown on The New TNN, debuting January 2002. Celebrity panelists included Ann Coulter, Harlan Ellison, Kathy Griffin, Cathy Scott and French Stewart, among others.

References

External links
 

2002 American television series debuts
2002 American television series endings
Television series about conspiracy theories
The Nashville Network original programming